Shailaja Reddy Alludu is a 2018 Indian Telugu-language romantic comedy film written and directed by Maruthi, produced by S. Radha Krishna, Suryadevara Naga Vamsi, PDV Prasad under the banner of Sithara Entertainments. It stars Naga Chaitanya, Anu Emmanuel and Ramya Krishna while Naresh, Murali Sharma, and Vennela Kishore appear in supporting roles. The music was composed by Gopi Sundar with cinematography done by Nizar Shafi and editing by Kotagiri Venkateswara Rao. The film released worldwide on 13 September 2018.

Plot
Chaitu Gaadu and Anu Reddy fall in love but are faced with the problem of convincing Anu's mother Shailaja Reddy, a domineering woman who is determined to find a doctor as her son-in-law. Anu and her mother Shailaja haven't talked for 5 years over a problem, Anu's mom wanted her to become a doctor, to which Anu declined as she wanted to pursue arts. Anu's mom then decided to marry her to a doctor but she declined that too. For 5 years they have been talking via Manikyam. Chaitanya's father has a very high ego. When he learned that his son likes Anu, surprisingly he agreed to make her his daughter-in-law and engaged them without Shailaja's permission. When Anu's uncle found out he took her from there and Anu asked him to promise not to tell her mom. Then rest of the story follows how Chaitu convinced Shailaja to make him her Son-in-law.

Cast

Release
At first the film was scheduled to release on 30 August 2018 and later postponed due to 2018 Kerala floods. It was re-scheduled to release on 13 September 2018.

Soundtrack 

Music of the film was composed by Gopi Sundar and the audio was released through Aditya Music label.

Reception

Box office 
Shailaja Reddy Alludu, on the opening day it collected a total gross of 13.16 Crores and a share of 8.18 Crores worldwide.
In the four day extended first weekend, movie collected a total gross of 28.29 Crores and a share of 17.25 Crores worldwide.

In the first weekend Shailaja Reddy Alludu beats movies like Manmarziyaan and Seema Raja in the overseas market by collecting a total gross of 2.95 Crores, and collected 2.60 Crores in United States, 6.54 Lakhs in United Kingdom, 27.11 Lakhs in Australia and 1.71 Lakhs in New Zealand respectively.

Critical reception 
The Times of India gave 3 out of 5 stars stating "Some preaching, some family drama, some humour and Shailaja Reddy Alludu plays safe for a festive release". Hindustan Times gave 2 out of 5 stars stating "Shailaja Reddy Alludu is a commercial entertainer and the same old formula of a sincere son-in-law who helps his lady love’s family is presented well. However, don’t go expecting anything beyond the film says it is – a formulaic entertainer that never even attempts to be anything more".

Accolades
South Indian International Movie Awards
 Nominated - SIIMA Award for Best Supporting Actress (Telugu) - Ramya Krishna
 Nominated - SIIMA Award for Best Comedian (Telugu) - Prudhvi Raj

References

Indian romantic comedy films
2010s Telugu-language films
2018 romantic comedy films
Films directed by Maruthi
Films set in Hyderabad, India
Films set in Telangana
Films shot in Hyderabad, India
Films scored by Gopi Sundar